Sergei Valeryevich Mozyakin (born 30 March 1981) is a Russian former professional ice hockey winger who last played for Metallurg Magnitogorsk in the Kontinental Hockey League (KHL). With over 735 points and 162 playoff points in his KHL career, he is both the six-time points leader (2008–09, 2009–10, 2012–13, 2013–14, 2015–16, 2016–17), and the all-time highest scorer in both the regular season and the playoffs in the KHL.

Although Mozyakin was drafted in the ninth round of the 2002 NHL Entry Draft by the Columbus Blue Jackets, Mozyakin never opted to leave the KHL in his career.

Playing career
Sergei Mozyakin, a highly skilled winger, was drafted in the ninth round of the 2002 NHL Entry Draft, 263rd overall by the Columbus Blue Jackets, but chose not to play for the team or in the NHL. In the 2005–06 Russian Superleague (RSL) regular season, Mozyakin had a tight scoring race with Aleksey Morozov and Evgeni Malkin for the top scorer of the league. Mozyakin finished the season leading the league with 52 points.

In the 2007–08 RSL regular season, which would be its final in existence before being absorbed into the KHL, Mozyakin had another tight scoring race with Morozov and finished the season only one point ahead of Morozov, leading the league in goals (37) and points (64). He went on to win the scoring title six times in the KHL (2008–09, 2009–10, 2012–13, 2013–14, 2015–16, and 2016–17), giving him eight elite league scoring titles.

On February 17, 2013, Mozyakin signed a six-year contract extension to remain with Magnitogorsk. In the 2013–14 KHL season, he won the Gagarin Cup with Metallurg Magnitogorsk as team captain and leading scorer.

Mozyakin has also been a regular member of the Russian national team, taking part in all twelve EHT games in the 2007–08 season. He scored four goals and three assists for seven points in the tournament. Mozyakin also took part in the 2008 and 2009 World Championship-winning Russian gold medal teams. He also competed as a member of the Olympic Athletes from Russia team at the 2018 Winter Olympics.

On July 5, 2021, Mozyakin announced his retirement.

Personal life
Sergei and his wife Yulia have a son, Andrei, and two daughters, Maria and Daria.

Career statistics

Regular season and playoffs

International

Awards and honors

References

External links

1981 births
Atlant Moscow Oblast players
Columbus Blue Jackets draft picks
HC CSKA Moscow players
Living people
Metallurg Magnitogorsk players
Russian ice hockey right wingers
Val-d'Or Foreurs players
Sportspeople from Yaroslavl
Ice hockey players at the 2018 Winter Olympics
Olympic ice hockey players of Russia
Medalists at the 2018 Winter Olympics
Olympic medalists in ice hockey
Olympic gold medalists for Olympic Athletes from Russia